The 2017 season is Thai Honda Ladkrabang season in the Thai League T1

Thai Honda Ladkrabang
2017